PNY Technologies, Inc., doing business as PNY, is an American manufacturer of flash memory cards, USB flash drives, solid state drives, memory upgrade modules, portable battery chargers, computer locks, cables, chargers, adapters, and consumer and professional graphics cards. The company is headquartered in Parsippany-Troy Hills, New Jersey.

PNY stands for "Paris, New York", as they used to trade memory modules between Paris and New York.

History 
PNY Electronics, Inc. originated out of Brooklyn, New York in 1985 as a company that bought and sold memory chips.

In 1996, the company was headquartered in Moonachie, New Jersey, and had a manufacturing production plant there, an additional plant in Santa Clara, California, and served Europe from a third facility in Bordeaux, France.

To emphasize its expansion into manufacturing new forms of memory and complementary products, the company changed its name in 1997 to PNY Technologies, Inc. The company now has main offices in Parsippany, New Jersey; Santa Clara, California; Miami, Florida; Bordeaux, France, and Taiwan.

In 2009, the New Jersey Nets sold the naming rights of their practice jerseys to PNY.  In 2010, New Jersey Governor Chris Christie spoke to PNY CEO Gadi Cohen about staying in New Jersey after Cohen was reportedly considering a move to Pennsylvania.  In 2011, PNY moved their global headquarters and main manufacturing facility to a 40+ acre location on Jefferson Road in Parsippany, NJ.  Lt. Governor Kim Guadagno toured the company and called it "a real good business news story for New Jersey."

Products 
PNY is a memory and graphics technology company and manufacturer of computer peripherals, including the following products:
 Flash memory cards
 USB flash drives
 Solid state drives
 Memory upgrades
 NVIDIA GeForce and Quadro graphics cards
 HDMI cables
 DRAM modules
 Portable battery chargers
 HP Pendrive & MicroSD Cards

Legacy products:
 CD-R discs

PNY has introduced water-cooled video cards and themed USB flash drives that include full films.

References

External links 
 

Companies based in Morris County, New Jersey
American companies established in 1985
Computer companies established in 1985
1985 establishments in New York City
Computer companies of the United States
Computer memory companies
Graphics hardware companies
Manufacturing companies based in New Jersey
Parsippany-Troy Hills, New Jersey
Privately held companies based in New Jersey